Radziechów may refer to the following places:
Radziechów, Lower Silesian Voivodeship in Gmina Zagrodno, Złotoryja County in Lower Silesian Voivodeship (SW Poland)
Radekhiv (Polish: Radziechów), a city in Lviv Oblast of Ukraine
Radekhiv (Polish: Radziechów), a village in Liuboml Raion in Volyn Oblast of Ukraine